"I'm So Excited" is a 1982 song by The Pointer Sisters.

I'm So Excited may also refer to:

I'm So Excited
 I'm So Excited!, a 2013 film directed by Pedro Almodóvar
 "I'm So Excited" (Anja Nissen song) (2014)

See also
So Excited (disambiguation)